"Moscow Never Sleeps" (Russian: Москва никогда не спит) is a song recorded by Russian electronic musician DJ Smash who was inspired by the song One (Always Hardcore) by the German music group Scooter.

A reworked version of this song, with the alternative refrain "Russia Never Sleeps", accompanied the Russian bid presentation for the 2018 FIFA World Cup.

The melody and rhythmical base of the song is very close to "Move on Baby" by the Italian group Cappella, though it is unknown if the similarity is occasional or intended.

Content
The song is sung in both English and Russian (Я люблю тебя, Москва, meaning "I love you, Moscow"). It is an ode to the titular city of Moscow.

Chart performance
It reached number 1 on the Moscow Airplay Chart in 2008.

References

2007 singles
Russian songs
Songs about Moscow
2007 songs